Ataxin is a type of nuclear protein. The class is called ataxin because mutated forms of these proteins and their corresponding genes were found to cause progressive ataxia.

Some examples, their coding genes and associated diseases include:
 Ataxin 1, coded by ATXN1. Mutants of ataxin 1 with a polyglutamine expansion cause SCA1.
 Ataxin 2, coded by ATXN2. It is known to cause SCA2 with polyglutamine expansion.
 Ataxin 3, coded by ATXN3. Machado-Joseph disease is caused by polyglutamine expansions in ataxin 3.
 Ataxin 7, coded by ATXN7. Polyglutamine expansions in Ataxin 7 cause SCA7.
 Ataxin 8, coded by ATXN8. Ataxin 8 does not cause an ataxic order, but a gene on the opposite strand, ATXN8OS, causes Spinocerebellar ataxia type 8 with CTG expansion.
 Ataxin 10, coded by ATXN10. It is associated with the pentanucleotide disorder, SCA10.
Frataxin, follows a similar naming convention and is coded by the FXN gene. GAA repeat expansions in a non-coding region of FXN cause Friedreich's ataxia when both copies of the gene are affected.

References

Protein families